German submarine U-979 was a Type VIIC U-boat built for Nazi Germany's Kriegsmarine for service during World War II.
She was laid down on 10 August 1942 by Blohm & Voss, Hamburg as yard number 179, launched on 15 April 1943 and commissioned on 20 May 1943 under Oberleutnant zur See Johannes Meermeier.

Design
German Type VIIC submarines were preceded by the shorter Type VIIB submarines. U-979 had a displacement of  when at the surface and  while submerged. She had two shafts and two  propellers.

U-979 was fitted with five  torpedo tubes (four fitted at the bow and one at the stern), fourteen torpedoes, one  SK C/35 naval gun, 220 rounds, and one twin  C/30 anti-aircraft gun. The boat had a complement of between forty-four and sixty.

Service history
The boat's career began with training at 5th Flotilla on 20 May 1943, followed by active service on 1 August 1944 as part of the 9th Flotilla, then as part of the 11th Flotilla until she was scuttled.

Wolfpacks
U-979 took part in no wolfpacks.

Fate
U-979 was scuttled on 24 May 1945 at Amrum, Germany at  after running aground.

Summary of raiding history

References

Bibliography

External links

German Type VIIC submarines
1943 ships
U-boats commissioned in 1943
U-boats scuttled in 1945
World War II submarines of Germany
Ships built in Hamburg
World War II shipwrecks in the North Sea
Maritime incidents in May 1945